Little Caesars Arena is a multi-purpose arena in Detroit. Before both the Detroit Red Wings and Detroit Pistons played a game at the arena, announcements were made by many different musical artists that the arena would be used for concerts. The following is a complete list of all concerts and music events that have been or will be held at the arena.

Events

2010s

2020s

Notes

References

Entertainment events at Little Caesars Arena
Entertainment events in the United States
Lists of events by venue
Lists of events in the United States